Pre-mRNA-splicing factor SYF1 is a protein that in humans is encoded by the XAB2 gene.

Interactions 

XAB2 has been shown to interact with ERCC8 and XPA.

References

Further reading